Austromitra is a genus of sea snails, marine gastropod mollusks in the family Costellariidae.

Species
Species within the genus Austromitra include:
 Austromitra aikeni Lussi, 2015
 † Austromitra ambulacrum (Marwick, 1926) 
 Austromitra analogica (Reeve, 1845)
 Austromitra angulata (Suter, 1908)
 † Austromitra angusticostata Ludbrook, 1941 
 Austromitra arnoldi (Verco, 1909)
 Austromitra bathyraphe (Sowerby III, 1900)
 Austromitra bellapicta (Verco, 1909)
 Austromitra canaliculata (Sowerby III, 1900)
 Austromitra capensis (Reeve, 1845)
 Austromitra cernohorskyi Turner, 2008
 Austromitra cinnamomea (A. Adams, 1855)
 Austromitra decresca Simone & Cunha, 2012
 Austromitra distincta (Thiele, 1925)
 Austromitra euzonata Sowerby III, 1900
 Austromitra gradusspira Lussi, 2015
 Austromitra hayesi Turner, 1999
 Austromitra ima (Bartsch, 1915)
 Austromitra kowieensis (Sowerby III, 1901)
 † Austromitra lacertosa (Cernohorsky, 1970) 
 Austromitra lawsi Finlay, 1930
 Austromitra legrandi (Tenison-Woods, 1876)
 Austromitra maculosa Turner & Simone, 1997
 Austromitra minutenodosa Cernohorsky, 1980
 Austromitra planata (Hutton, 1885)
 † Austromitra pumila (Tate, 1889) 
 † Austromitra quenelli C. A. Fleming, 1943
 † Austromitra ralphi (Cossmann, 1900)
 Austromitra retrocurvata (Verco, 1909)
 Austromitra rhodarion (Kilburn, 1972)
 Austromitra rosenbergi R. Salisbury, 2015
 Austromitra rubiginosa (Hutton, 1873)
 Austromitra sansibarica (Thiele, 1925)
 Austromitra schomburgki (Angas, 1878)
 † Austromitra sordida (Tate, 1889) 
 Austromitra tasmanica (Tenison-Woods, 1876)
 Austromitra valarieae Lussi, 2015
 Austromitra volucra (Hedley, 1915)
 Austromitra zafra Powell, 1952
Species brought into synonymy
 Austromitra brunneacincta Powell, 1952: synonym of Austromitra planata (Hutton, 1885)
 Austromitra bucklandi Gabriel, 1962: synonym of Austromitra tasmanica (Tenison Woods, 1876)
 † Austromitra caudata Marwick, 1931: synonym of † Costellaria caudata (Marwick, 1931): synonym of †Vexillum caudatum (Marwick, 1931) (original combination)
 Austromitra erecta Powell, 1934: synonym of Austromitra rubiginosa (Hutton, 1873)
 †Austromitra mawsoni Ludbrook, 1958 †: synonym of †Austromitra angusticostata Ludbrook, 1941 
 † Austromitra pauciplicata Ludbrook, 1958: synonym of † Austromitra angusticostata Ludbrook, 1941
 Austromitra planatella Finlay, 1930: synonym of Austromitra planata (Hutton, 1885)
 † Austromitra plicifera Marwick, 1928: synonym of † Peculator pliciferus (Marwick, 1928)
 Austromitra rubiradix Finlay, 1926: synonym of Austromitra rubiginosa (Hutton, 1873)
 †Austromitra tricordata Beu, 1970: synonym of † Egestas tricordata (Beu, 1970)

Classification
Biota
Animalia (Kingdom)
Mollusca (Phylum)
Gastropoda (Class)
Caenogastropoda (Subclass)
Neogastropoda (Order)
Turbinelloidea (Superfamily)
Costellariidae (Family)
Austromitra (Genus)

References

External links
 Finlay H.J. (1926). A further commentary on New Zealand molluscan systematics. Transactions and Proceedings of the New Zealand Institute. 57: 320-485, pls 18-23
 Fedosov A.E., Puillandre N., Herrmann M., Dgebuadze P. & Bouchet P. (2017). Phylogeny, systematics, and evolution of the family Costellariidae (Gastropoda: Neogastropoda). Zoological Journal of the Linnean Society. 179(3): 541-626